Tone Haugen (born 6 February 1964) is a former Norwegian professional footballer who played as a midfielder. With the Norway women's national team, Haugen won the 1995 FIFA Women's World Cup and an Olympic bronze medal in 1996. At club level she played for SK Trondheims-Ørn in Norway, then joined Japanese L. League team Nikko Securities Dream Ladies on a professional contract.

Haugen debuted for the Norwegian national team in 1984, and scored 19 goals in her 90 caps.

In 2000 Haugen took a job as player-coach of 1. divisjon club Fortuna Ålesund.

Personal life

As an out lesbian, she was in Norway's women's football team for the 2002 Gay Games. In 2014, she was working as a municipal gardener in Ålesund.

References

External links
 
 
  
  
 
 

1964 births
Living people
Norwegian women's footballers
Footballers at the 1996 Summer Olympics
Olympic footballers of Norway
Olympic bronze medalists for Norway
Olympic medalists in football
1991 FIFA Women's World Cup players
1995 FIFA Women's World Cup players
Norway women's international footballers
FIFA Women's World Cup-winning players
Norwegian expatriate women's footballers
Norwegian expatriate sportspeople in Japan
SK Trondheims-Ørn players
Fortuna Ålesund players
Toppserien players
LGBT association football players
Lesbian sportswomen
Norwegian LGBT sportspeople
Nikko Securities Dream Ladies players
Nadeshiko League players
Expatriate women's footballers in Japan
Medalists at the 1996 Summer Olympics
UEFA Women's Championship-winning players
Women's association football midfielders
People from Namsos
Sportspeople from Trøndelag